Northumbria, a kingdom of Angles, in what is now northern England and south-east Scotland, was initially divided into two kingdoms: Bernicia and Deira. The two were first united by king Æthelfrith around the year 604, and except for occasional periods of division over the subsequent century, they remained so. The exceptions are during the brief period from 633 to 634, when Northumbria was plunged into chaos by the death of king Edwin in battle and the ruinous invasion of Cadwallon ap Cadfan, king of Gwynedd. The unity of the Northumbrian kingdoms was restored after Cadwallon's death in battle in 634.

Another exception is a period from about the year 644 to 664, when kings ruled individually over Deira. In 651, king Oswiu had Oswine of Deira killed and replaced by Œthelwald, but Œthelwald did not prove to be a loyal sub-king, allying with the Mercian king Penda; according to Bede, Œthelwald acted as Penda's guide during the latter's invasion of Northumbria but withdrew his forces when the Mercians met the Northumbrians at the Battle of Winwaed. After the Mercian defeat at Winwaed, Œthelwald lost power and Oswiu's own son, Alchfrith, became king in his place. In 670, Ælfwine, the brother of the childless king Ecgfrith, was made king of Deira; by this point the title may have been used primarily to designate an heir. Ælfwine was killed in battle against Mercia in 679, and there was not another separate king of Deira until the time of Norse rule.

Kings of Bernicia

Kings of Deira

Kings of Northumbria

Kings of Jorvik 
Viking kings ruled Jórvík (southern Northumbria, the former Deira) from its capital York for most of the period between 867 and 954. Northern Northumbria (the former Bernicia) was ruled by Anglo-Saxons from their base in Bamburgh. Many details are uncertain as the history of Northumbria in the ninth and tenth centuries is poorly recorded.

Although Eadred claimed rule from 946, the Kingdom of Northumbria was not absorbed permanently into England until after 954. Thereafter Osulf had control of all Northumbria under Eadred.  See Rulers of Bamburgh for subsequent lords of Bamburgh after Osulf, none of whom ruled as kings.

Family tree
 - Kings of Bernicia;
 - Kings of Deira;
 - Kings of Northumbria

See also
Rulers of Bamburgh
Earl of York
Earl of Northumbria
Earl of Northumberland
List of English monarchs

Notes

References

External links
The History Files - Anglo-Saxon Britain - The Kings of Northumbria

 
Northumbria
Northumbria